New Cleveland is an unincorporated community in Putnam County, in the U.S. state of Ohio.

History
The post office New Cleveland once had was called Brickner. This post office was established in 1880, and remained in operation until 1901.

Holy Family Catholic Church (the inspiration for WJTA "Holy Family Radio") is located in New Cleveland on State Route 109..

References

Unincorporated communities in Putnam County, Ohio
Unincorporated communities in Ohio